This is a list of rivers in the U.S. state of Rhode Island. Rivers in bold are considered major rivers either geographically or historically.

By stream network
All rivers eventually empty into the Atlantic Ocean. Rivers are listed in order from west to east along the coastline, with tributary rivers listed from downstream to upstream along main stem rivers.

West of Narragansett Bay
Thames River (Connecticut)
Quinebaug River (Connecticut)
Five Mile River
Leeson Brook
Moosup River
Quaduck Brook
Pawcatuck River
Ashaway River
Green Fall River
Wood River
Flat River
Beaver River
Usquepaug River
Queen River
Chipuxet River

Narragansett Bay
Saugatucket River
Pettaquamscutt River
Mattatuxet River
Annaquatucket River
Pine River
Potowomut River
Hunt River
Maskerchugg River
Providence River
Pawtuxet River
Pocasset River
North Branch Pawtuxet River
Moswansicut River
Ponaganset River
South Branch Pawtuxet River
Mishnock River
Big River
Carr River
Congdon River
Nooseneck River
Flat River
Woonasquatucket River
Stillwater River
Moshassuck River
West River
Seekonk River
Ten Mile River
Sevenmile River
Wilde River
Blackstone River
Abbott Run
Millers River
Peters River
Mill River
Branch River
Chepachet River
Clear River
Nipmuc River
Chockalog River
Pascoag River
Warren River
Barrington River
Runnins River
Palmer River

East of Narragansett Bay
Kickamuit River
Sakonnet River
Maidford River
Maiford River
Quaket River

Alphabetically
Abbott Run
Annaquatucket River
Ashaway River
Barrington River
Beaver River
Big River
Blackstone River
Branch River
Carr River
Chepachet River
Chipuxet River
Chockalog River
Clear River
Congdon River
Flat River (Kent County, Rhode Island)
Flat River (Washington County, Rhode Island)
Green Fall River
Hunt River
Kickamuit River
Maidford River
Maiford River
Maskerchugg River
Mattatuxet River
Mill River
Millers River
Mishnock River
Moosup River
Moshassuck River
Moswansicut River
Nipmuc River
Nooseneck River
North Branch Pawtuxet River
Palmer River
Pascoag River
Pawcatuck River
Pawtuxet River
Peters River
Pettaquamscutt River
Pine River
Pocasset River
Ponaganset River
Potowomut River
Providence River
Quaket River
Queen's River
Runnins River
Sakonnet River
Saugatucket River
Seekonk River
Sevenmile River
South Branch Pawtuxet River
Stillwater River
Ten Mile River
Usquepaug River
Warren River
West River
Wilde River
Wood River
Woonasquatucket River

See also

List of rivers in the United States

Rhode Island
 
Rivers